The 1991 Budweiser at The Glen was the 18th stock car race of the 1991 NASCAR Winston Cup Series and the sixth iteration of the event. The race was held on Sunday, August 11, 1991, before an audience of 125,000 on the  short course at Watkins Glen International in Watkins Glen, New York, USA. 

The race was won by Ernie Irvan in the #4 Kodak Chevrolet for Morgan-McClure Motorsports. Ricky Rudd finished second in the #5 Tide Chevrolet for Hendrick Motorsports, and Mark Martin finished third in the #6 Valvoline Ford for Roush Racing.

The race was marred by a crash involving Jimmy Means and J. D. McDuffie in the circuit's fifth turn, The Loop, during lap five. A mechanical failure on McDuffie's #70 Pontiac led to him crashing at nearly full race speed into a tire barrier, where he was killed on impact.

Background

Entry list 

 (R) denotes rookie driver.

Qualifying 
Qualifying was split into two rounds. The first round was held on Friday, August 9, at 1:00 PM EST. Each driver would have one lap to set a time. During the first round, the top 20 drivers in the round would be guaranteed a starting spot in the race. If a driver was not able to guarantee a spot in the first round, they had the option to scrub their time from the first round and try and run a faster lap time in a second round qualifying run, held on Saturday, August 10, at 11:00 AM EST. As with the first round, each driver would have one lap to set a time. For this specific race, positions 21-40 would be decided on time, and depending on who needed it, a select amount of positions were given to cars who had not otherwise qualified on time but were high enough in owner's points; up to two provisionals were given. If needed, a past champion who did not qualify on either time or provisionals could use a champion's provisional, adding one more spot to the field.

The lap was a new track record. Thirty-nine drivers qualified on time. Michael Waltrip crashed his #30 Pennzoil Pontiac during his qualifying run and did not record a time, starting fortieth with a provisional. Jim Sauter, Jerry O’Neil, and Bob Ferree all were entered but withdrew from the event.

Full qualifying results 

Allison and Marcis were forced to start from the rear of the field. Allison pitted while on the pace laps, while Marcis started the race in a backup car.

Lap 5 crash
As the field entered the Loop on lap 5, the left front wheel spindle broke on J.D. McDuffie's #70 L.C. Whitford Pontiac, causing his brakes to fail and a wheel to come off of the car. He made contact with Jimmy Means, like McDuffie an owner-driver, and both the #70 and Means' #52 Alka-Seltzer Pontiac left the racing surface and ran into the grassy runoff area near the exit of the Loop. Traveling at over 160 MPH with no way to stop or slow his car, McDuffie hit a tire wall protecting the Armco barrier in the runoff area so hard that his car went airborne, flipped over while in the air, and landed upside down in the grass. McDuffie suffered a basilar skull fracture in the accident and died instantly.

Means, meanwhile, was able to slow his car down before he hit the tire barrier; the #52 actually went underneath the #70 while it was in the air. Getting out of his own wrecked car, Means went over to McDuffie to check on his fellow driver. A few seconds later, having seen McDuffie's condition, Means began frantically waving for track safety officials to come to the scene. Means then spoke to Ned Jarrett, who as mentioned before was stationed on the track just behind where the accident occurred, on the ESPN broadcast moments later that he hoped his fellow driver was okay but conceded the situation did not look good. Means later said he had to "close his eyes" after seeing McDuffie in his car.

Just as the drivers completed the fifth lap, NASCAR threw the red flag and stopped the drivers on the front stretch. The race was red-flagged for one hour and 48 minutes, first to extract McDuffie from his vehicle, and then to allow time for track workers to repair the guardrail in that location. Later, as the race was restarting, Jerry Punch of ESPN and Bill Bowser of MRN were both present for the official statement from Winston Cup Media Director Chip Williams that McDuffie had died from his injuries sustained in the crash. On ESPN, Bob Jenkins then eulogized McDuffie before Benny Parsons spoke directly to McDuffie's widow, Ima Jean.

As he had mentioned, Parsons had his own experience in having to deal with a spousal death. Earlier that season, during the Winston Cup’s June race weekend at Pocono, he had stayed behind at his North Carolina home to be with his wife Connie as she battled a terminal illness. On the day of the race, which Jenkins and Jarrett called without him, Connie Parsons died.

McDuffie was credited with a last-place finish of 40th, while Means was credited with a 39th place finish.

This incident was the second serious accident at Turn 5 that year. During the Camel Continental sports car race held earlier in the year, Tommy Kendall crashed in the same area after losing control of his vehicle; he, like McDuffie, lost a wheel before crashing, and Kendall would break both of his legs in the incident.

In the wake of both serious incidents, Watkins Glen International track officials decided to reconfigure the Loop. While the turn itself stayed as it was, a chicane was added near the entrance of the turn and referred to as the Inner Loop. The decision of whether or not to use the chicane was left up to the organizers of the races held on the course, with NASCAR opting to use the Inner Loop for each subsequent race that it has run at Watkins Glen. In races that use the Inner Loop, access to the full Loop is blocked with pylons; in races that use the Loop as it is normally configured, access to the Inner Loop is blocked.

Race results

Standings after the race 

Drivers' Championship standings

Note: Only the first 10 positions are included for the driver standings.

References

Budweiser At The Glen
Budweiser At The Glen
Budweiser At The Glen
NASCAR races at Watkins Glen International